The Beatles Monument is a monument to the English rock band The Beatles in Kók Tóbe Park, Almaty, Kazakhstan.

Monument composition 
The composition of the monument represents a bronze bench on which sits John Lennon playing the guitar, surrounded by the other members of the band standing: Paul McCartney, Ringo Starr and George Harrison. Songs by The Beatles are constantly played from speakers.

Installation details 
The bronze monument by sculptor Eduard Kazaryan on Kok-Tobe Mountain was unveiled in 2007. The funds for the construction of the monument were allocated by the "Seimar" charitable non-profit foundation. The competition committee considered a large number of designs for the monument and only one was chosen. Permission for installing the monument was obtained from the Ministry of Culture of Kazakhstan: this required obtaining agreement with the rights holder of The Beatles brand. In addition, the surviving members of the band, Paul McCartney and Ringo Starr, gave their consent to build the monument.

References 

Statues in Kazakhstan
Monuments and memorials to the Beatles
Buildings and structures in Almaty
Buildings and structures completed in 2007
2007 establishments in Kazakhstan